Alberto Rosso (born 29 September 1959) is an Italian Air Force general. He served as Chief of Staff of the Italian Air Force from 31 October 2018 to 28 October 2021.

References 

Living people
1959 births
Place of birth missing (living people)
Italian aviators
Italian Air Force generals